The  is a Japanese third-sector railway operating company established in 2012 to operate passenger railway services on the section of the JR West Hokuriku Main Line within Toyama Prefecture when it was separated from the JR West network in March 2015, coinciding with the opening of the Hokuriku Shinkansen extension from  to . The company was founded on 24 July 2012, and has its headquarters in Toyama (city) in Toyama Prefecture.

Shareholders
, Toyama Prefecture is the main shareholder, owning 63% of the company's shares, 27% is owned by municipalities within Toyama Prefecture, and 10% is owned by private-sector businesses.

Ainokaze Toyama Railway Line

Service outline
In addition to all-stations  services, limited-stop "Rapid" services named  operate between Tomari and Toyama or Kanazawa during the weekday morning and evening peaks. A supplementary liner fare of 300 yen is required to board these services, and all seats are reserved.

ICOCA and other compatible IC farecards can be used on the line since 26 March 2015.

Stations

Rolling stock
Services on the line use a fleet of 16 two-car 521 series (2nd-batch type) electric multiple unit (EMU) trains and five three-car 413 series EMUs (former sets B01 to B03, B07, and B10) acquired from JR West. The 521 series trains will receive a new livery with a blue wave design on the seaward (north) side and a green wave design on the landward (south) side. While both the Ainokaze Toyama Railway and neighbouring IR Ishikawa Railway operate similar 521 series trains, the respective operators' trains do not run coupled together.

, the 521 series and 413 series fleets are as follows.

521 series

413 series

Set AM03 was modified for use as a special-event train, named  with new seat covers and a new external livery, returning to service on 28 August 2016. This train is also used to provide additional capacity on regular services during the peak periods.

Future developments
From the first half of fiscal 2018, a 413 series set will be rebuilt as a tourist train, returning to service on the line in the second half of fiscal 2018.

Five new 521-1000 series two-car sets are scheduled to be introduced over a period of six years, with the first set delivered in December 2017. These sets will replace the ageing 413 series EMUs.

History
The company was founded on 24 July 2012. The company name "Ainokaze Toyama Railway" was announced on 30 May 2013. Ainokaze refers to a north-easterly breeze that blows in the region in spring and summer, and is mentioned in the Man'yōshū collection of Japanese poetry.

The company was formally granted a railway operating license by the Ministry of Land, Infrastructure, Transport and Tourism on 28 February 2014.

Future developments
New stations are planned to be built between Takaoka and Nishi-Takaoka, and between Toyama and Higashi-Toyama.

See also
List of railway companies in Japan
List of railway lines in Japan

References

External links

  

Railway companies of Japan
Companies based in Toyama Prefecture
Japanese companies established in 2012
Railway companies established in 2012
1067 mm gauge railways in Japan
Japanese third-sector railway lines